Rolf Schild OBE (1924 - 2003), was a German-born, British-based businessman, a Jewish refugee from Nazi Germany who formed the company Huntleigh Technology, based in Luton, which manufactured and designed medical equipment.

Background
Schild is perhaps best remembered for being a victim of a notorious kidnapping, with his wife and daughter, by a gang while on holiday in Sardinia in 1979. He was released 16 days later; his wife was set free in January 1980, and his daughter in March of that year. £220,000 was paid in ransom money; two years later, 13 people were found guilty of the crime and were jailed.

Born in Cologne, Rolf Schild came to Britain in 1939; he later learned his parents were gassed to death by the Nazis in Chelmno in 1942. He later developed a talent in medical engineering, and in the early 1950s formed his own company, SE Technology, later to become Huntleigh. His achievements in medical design were rewarded with an OBE in 1997.

External links 
Rolf Schild obituary by Caroline Richmond

1924 births
2003 deaths
Jewish emigrants from Nazi Germany to the United Kingdom
20th-century British businesspeople
British Jews
Officers of the Order of the British Empire
Kidnapped British people